IPAT may refer to:
 I = PAT equation in environmental science
 Interdisciplinary Project group for Appropriate Technology, 1976–1988, TU-Berlin
 iPAT is a term used in fMRI imaging by Siemens, for its implementation of parallel imaging (a method to increase the speed of image acquisition).
 Institute for Personality and Ability Testing